Nelson-Creston is a provincial electoral district for the Legislative Assembly of British Columbia, Canada. It made its first appearance on the hustings in the general election of 1933 following a redistribution of the earlier Nelson riding.

Historically, the riding was consistently held by the "free enterprise" party of the era. Until 1952, this alternated between the BC Liberals and the Coalition, while after the election in 1952, Social Credit won every election until the BC NDP victory in 1972.

Since 1972, the NDP has won all but two elections: in the 1986 election, Social Credit won the riding along with many others in the Interior and in 2001, prominent NDP Cabinet minister Corky Evans was defeated in an election that saw all but two NDP MLAs suffer defeat. Since the 2005 election, the NDP has won the riding by wide margins.

Demographics

Geography
As of the 2020 provincial election, Nelson-Creston comprises the eastern portion of the Regional District of Central Kootenay. It is located in southeastern British Columbia and is bordered by the United States to the south. Communities in the electoral district consist of Nelson, Creston, Salmo, and Kaslo.

History

Members of the Legislative Assembly

Election results 

|-

|NDP
|Michelle Mungall
|align="right"|9,060
|align="right"|55.83%
|align="center"|−3.97
|align="right"|$52,366

|- style="background:white;"
! style="text-align:right;" colspan="3"|Total valid votes
!align="right"| 16,523
!align="right"|100%
|- style="background:white;"
! style="text-align:right;" colspan="3"|Total rejected ballots
!align="right"|98
!align="right"|0.6%
|- style="background:white;"
! style="text-align:right;" colspan="3"|Turnout
!align="right"|16,621
!align="right"|60%
|}

 
|NDP
|Corky Evans
|align="right"|12,896
|align="right"|58.80%
|align="right"|+26.98
|align="right"|$59,942

|- style="background:white;"
! style="text-align:right;" colspan="3"|Total valid votes
!align="right"|21,931
|- style="background:white;"
! style="text-align:right;" colspan="3"|Total rejected ballots
!align="right"|137
!align="right"|0.62%
|- style="background:white;"
! style="text-align:right;" colspan="3"|Turnout
!align="right"|22,068
!align="right"|67.88%

|-

|-
 
|NDP
|Corky Evans
|align="right"|6,981
|align="right"|31.82%
|align="right"|−13.08
|align="right"|$46,070

|- bgcolor="white"
!align="right" colspan=3|Total valid votes
!align="right"|21,940
!align="right"|100.00%
!align="right"|
!align="right"|
|- bgcolor="white"
!align="right" colspan=3|Total rejected ballots
!align="right"|79
!align="right"|0.36%
!align="right"|
!align="right"|
|- bgcolor="white"
!align="right" colspan=3|Turnout
!align="right"|22,019
!align="right"|75.32%
!align="right"|
!align="right"|
|}

|-
 
|NDP
|Corky Evans
|align="right"|9,179
|align="right"|44.90%
|align="right"|−2.01
|align="right"|$42,880
|-

|Natural Law
|Ruth Anne Taves
|align="right"|73
|align="right"|0.36%
|align="right"|
|align="right"|$398
|- bgcolor="white"
!align="right" colspan=3|Total valid votes
!align="right"|20,442
!align="right"|100.00%
!align="right"|
!align="right"|
|- bgcolor="white"
!align="right" colspan=3|Total rejected ballots
!align="right"|82
!align="right"|0.40%
!align="right"|
!align="right"|
|- bgcolor="white"
!align="right" colspan=3|Turnout
!align="right"|20,524
!align="right"|75.20%
!align="right"|
!align="right"|
|}

|-
 
|NDP
|Corky Evans
|align="right"|8,583
|align="right"|46.91%
|align="right"|
|align="right"|$33,620

|-
|- bgcolor="white"
!align="right" colspan=3|Total valid votes
!align="right"|18,299
!align="right"|100.00%
!align="right"|
!align="right"|
|- bgcolor="white"
!align="right" colspan=3|Total rejected ballots
!align="right"|428
!align="right"|2.29%
!align="right"|
!align="right"|
|- bgcolor="white"
!align="right" colspan=3|Turnout
!align="right"|18,727
!align="right"|80.60%
!align="right"|
!align="right"|
|}

|-

 
|NDP
|Munro
|align="right"|2324
|align="right"|29.4%
|align="right"|
|align="right"|

|- bgcolor="white"
!align="right" colspan=3|Total valid votes
!align="right"|7899
!align="right"|100.00%
!align="right"|
!align="right"|
|- bgcolor="white"
!align="right" colspan=3|Total rejected ballots
!align="right"|91
!align="right"|1.1%
!align="right"|
!align="right"|
|- bgcolor="white"
!align="right" colspan=3|Turnout
!align="right"|7990
!align="right"|69.2%
!align="right"|
!align="right"|
|}

|-

 
|NDP
|Askevold
|align="right"|1943
|align="right"|21.4%
|align="right"|
|align="right"|

|Shorthouse
|align="right"|1474
|align="right"|16.3%
|align="right"|
|align="right"|
|- bgcolor="white"
!align="right" colspan=3|Total valid votes
!align="right"|9064
!align="right"|100.00%
!align="right"|
!align="right"|
|- bgcolor="white"
!align="right" colspan=3|Total rejected ballots
!align="right"|53
!align="right"|0.6%
!align="right"|
!align="right"|
|- bgcolor="white"
!align="right" colspan=3|Turnout
!align="right"|9117
!align="right"|75.2%
!align="right"|
!align="right"|
|}

|-

 
|Co-operative Commonwealth Fed.
|McNevin
|align="right"|2664
|align="right"|29.2%
|align="right"|
|align="right"|

|Taylor
|align="right"|730
|align="right"|8.0%
|align="right"|
|align="right"|
|- bgcolor="white"
!align="right" colspan=3|Total valid votes
!align="right"|9117
!align="right"|100.00%
!align="right"|
!align="right"|
|- bgcolor="white"
!align="right" colspan=3|Total rejected ballots
!align="right"|106
!align="right"|1.1%
!align="right"|
!align="right"|
|- bgcolor="white"
!align="right" colspan=3|Turnout
!align="right"|9223
!align="right"|76.0%
!align="right"|
!align="right"|
|}

|-

 
|Co-operative Commonwealth Fed.
|Affleck
|align="right"|2331
|align="right"|28.4%
|align="right"|
|align="right"|

|- bgcolor="white"
!align="right" colspan=3|Total valid votes
!align="right"|8213
!align="right"|100.00%
!align="right"|
!align="right"|
|- bgcolor="white"
!align="right" colspan=3|Total rejected ballots
!align="right"|86
!align="right"|1.0%
!align="right"|
!align="right"|
|- bgcolor="white"
!align="right" colspan=3|Turnout
!align="right"|8299?
!align="right"|71.0%
!align="right"|
!align="right"|
|}

|-

 
|Co-operative Commonwealth Fed.
|Drew
|align="right"|2675
|align="right"|33.6%
|align="right"|
|align="right"|

|- bgcolor="white"
!align="right" colspan=3|Total valid votes
!align="right"|7966
!align="right"|100.00%
!align="right"|
!align="right"|
|- bgcolor="white"
!align="right" colspan=3|Total rejected ballots
!align="right"|151
!align="right"|1.9%
!align="right"|
!align="right"|
|- bgcolor="white"
!align="right" colspan=3|Turnout
!align="right"|8117
!align="right"|79.6%
!align="right"|
!align="right"|
|}

|-

 
|Co-operative Commonwealth Fed.
|Phillips
|align="right"|1249
|align="right"|24.0%
|align="right"|
|align="right"|

|Independent
|Frisby
|align="right"|184
|align="right"|3.5%
|align="right"|
|align="right"|
|- bgcolor="white"
!align="right" colspan=3|Total valid votes
!align="right"|5214
!align="right"|100.00%
!align="right"|
!align="right"|
|- bgcolor="white"
!align="right" colspan=3|Total rejected ballots
!align="right"|39
!align="right"|0.7%
!align="right"|
!align="right"|
|- bgcolor="white"
!align="right" colspan=3|Turnout
!align="right"|5253
!align="right"|65.0%
!align="right"|
!align="right"|
|}

|-

|Liberal
|Frank Putnam
|align="right"|2144
|align="right"|33.5%
|align="right"|
|align="right"|

 
|Co-operative Commonwealth Fed.
|Frisby
|align="right"|2124
|align="right"|33.1%
|align="right"|
|align="right"|
|- bgcolor="white"
!align="right" colspan=3|Total valid votes
!align="right"|6408
!align="right"|100.00%
!align="right"|
!align="right"|
|- bgcolor="white"
!align="right" colspan=3|Total rejected ballots
!align="right"|89
!align="right"|1.4%
!align="right"|
!align="right"|
|- bgcolor="white"
!align="right" colspan=3|Turnout
!align="right"|6497
!align="right"|76.9%
!align="right"|
!align="right"|
|}

|-

|Liberal
|Frank Putnam
|align="right"|2149
|align="right"|39.2%
|align="right"|
|align="right"|

 
|Co-operative Commonwealth Fed.
|Bayliss
|align="right"|1121
|align="right"|20.4%
|align="right"|
|align="right"|

|Independent
|Mulholland
|align="right"|139
|align="right"|2.5%
|align="right"|
|align="right"|
|- bgcolor="white"
!align="right" colspan=3|Total valid votes
!align="right"|5487
!align="right"|100.00%
!align="right"|
!align="right"|
|- bgcolor="white"
!align="right" colspan=3|Total rejected ballots
!align="right"|61
!align="right"|1.1%
!align="right"|
!align="right"|
|- bgcolor="white"
!align="right" colspan=3|Turnout
!align="right"|5548
!align="right"|74.5%
!align="right"|
!align="right"|
|}

|-

|Liberal
|Frank Putnam
|align="right"|2489
|align="right"|49.2%

 
|Co-operative Commonwealth Fed.
|Walley 
|align="right"|1161
|align="right"|22.9%

|- bgcolor="white"
!align="right" colspan=3|Total valid votes
!align="right"|5060
!align="right"|100.00%
!align="right"|
!align="right"|
|- bgcolor="white"
!align="right" colspan=3|Total rejected ballots
!align="right"|102
!align="right"|2.0%
!align="right"|
!align="right"|
|- bgcolor="white"
!align="right" colspan=3|Turnout
!align="right"|5162
!align="right"|74.0%
!align="right"|
!align="right"|
|}

References

External links 
BC Stats Profile - 2001 (pdf)
Results of 2001 election (pdf)
2001 Expenditures
Results of 1996 election
1996 Expenditures
Results of 1991 election
1991 Expenditures
Website of the Legislative Assembly of British Columbia

British Columbia provincial electoral districts
Nelson, British Columbia